Daedra Janel Charles (November 22, 1968 – April 14, 2018) was an American women's basketball player and assistant coach at Tennessee. She was a member of the United States women's national basketball team that claimed the bronze medal at the 1992 Summer Olympics in Barcelona, Spain. Born in Detroit, Michigan, Charles attended the University of Tennessee. She twice helped Tennessee win the NCAA Women's Championship in 1989 and 1991. Charles was inducted into the Women's Basketball Hall of Fame in 2007.

USA Basketball
Charles was named to the national team invited to compete at the 1992 Olympics, held in Barcelona, Spain. The USA team won their first three games, but then played the Unified Team and fell, 79–73. The USA team then faced Cuba for the bronze medal. The game was tied at halftime, and Cuba had a small lead midway through the second half, but the USA went on a run to retake the lead, and finished with an 88–74 victory and the bronze medal. Charles averaged 6.2 points per game.

Charles continued to represent the USA on the national team when it competed in the 1994 World Championships in Sydney, Australia. The team was coached by Tara VanDerveer. The team won their early games. Against Spain, Charles led the USA scorers with 18 points, helping secure the win. She also contributed 22 points to a win against the host team Australia.  The team then advanced to the medal rounds and faced Brazil. Despite 29 points from Katrina McClain, the USA fell 110–107 when Brazil hit ten of ten free throws in the final minute. The USA went on to defeat Australia 100–95 to claim the bronze medal.

Awards and honors
 1991—Wade Trophy

Tennessee statistics
Source

Death
Charles died from undisclosed reasons on April 14, 2018, aged 49.

References

 

1968 births
2018 deaths
20th-century African-American sportspeople
21st-century African-American sportspeople
African-American basketball players
All-American college women's basketball players
American expatriate basketball people in France
American women's basketball coaches
American women's basketball players
Auburn Tigers women's basketball coaches
Basketball coaches from Michigan
Basketball players at the 1992 Summer Olympics
Basketball players from Detroit
Centers (basketball)
Detroit Mercy Titans women's basketball coaches
Los Angeles Sparks players
Medalists at the 1992 Summer Olympics
Olympic bronze medalists for the United States in basketball
Parade High School All-Americans (girls' basketball)
Power forwards (basketball)
Tarbes Gespe Bigorre players
Tennessee Lady Volunteers basketball coaches
Tennessee Lady Volunteers basketball players
United States women's national basketball team players